Greifensee Castle is a castle in the municipality of Greifensee and the canton of Zurich in Switzerland.  It was probably built by the House of Rapperswil and is a Swiss heritage site of national significance.

See also
 List of castles in Switzerland

References

External links
 

Castles in the canton of Zürich
House of Rapperswil
castle
Cultural property of national significance in the canton of Zürich
Gothic architecture in Switzerland